Stéphane Houcine Nater (born 20 January 1984) is a footballer who plays as a midfielder for FC Balzers. Born in France, he represented Tunisia at international level, and also holds Swiss citizenship having spent much of his upbringing there.

Club career
Nater was transferred to St. Gallen, where he was formed as a youth player, after two years at Servette FC, where he played one season in the Challenge League and one season in the top flight.

In the summer of 2014, he joined Club Africain for his first spell in the Tunisian league, signing a two-year deal.

International career
Nater has joined to the Tunisian national team in November 2013. He was an unused substitute in the final 2014 FIFA World Cup qualifying match against Cameroon. His international debut was in a friendly match against Colombia on 5 March 2014.

References

External links
 
 
 Stéphane Nater profile at football.ch
 

1981 births
Living people
Sportspeople from Troyes
Association football midfielders
French footballers
French emigrants to Switzerland
French sportspeople of Tunisian descent
Swiss people of Tunisian descent
Swiss people of French descent
Tunisian footballers
Swiss men's footballers
Swiss Super League players
Swiss Challenge League players
FC St. Gallen players
FC Schaffhausen players
GC Biaschesi players
FC Chur 97 players
FC Vaduz players
Servette FC players
Club Africain players
Étoile Sportive du Sahel players
FC Rapperswil-Jona players
Tunisia international footballers
Tunisian expatriate footballers
French expatriate footballers
Swiss expatriate footballers
French expatriate sportspeople in Liechtenstein
Tunisian expatriate sportspeople in Liechtenstein
Swiss expatriate sportspeople in Liechtenstein
Expatriate footballers in Liechtenstein
People with acquired Swiss citizenship
2015 Africa Cup of Nations players
Footballers from Grand Est